The Whisker Lake Wilderness is a  tract of protected land in Florence County, Wisconsin, managed by the United States Forest Service.  The wilderness is within the boundaries of the Chequamegon–Nicolet National Forest, and is on the border of Michigan and Wisconsin.

Whisker Lake
The lake is named for the trees at the shoreline of the lake, referred to by locals as "chin whiskers." Whisker Lake is one of 6 small lakes located within the wilderness.

See also
List of wilderness areas of the United States

References

External Links
 U.S. Geological Survey Map at the U.S. Geological Survey Map Website. Retrieved February 10th, 2022.

Protected areas of Wisconsin
Geography of Florence County, Wisconsin
Protected areas established in 1978